Barrio Cópola is a barrio of La Paz in the Canelones Department of southern Uruguay.

Geography

Location

Population
In 2011 Barrio Cópola had a population of 826.
 
Source: Instituto Nacional de Estadística de Uruguay

References

External links
INE map of La Paz, Barrio Cópola, Costa y Guillamón, Villa Paz S.A. and Barrio La Lucha

Populated places in the Canelones Department